In Marxism, reification is the process by which social relations are perceived as inherent attributes of the people involved in them, or attributes of some product of the relation, such as a traded commodity. This concept specifies the dialectical relationship between social existence and social consciousness – that is, between objective social relations and the subjective apprehension of those relations – in a society dominated by commodity production.

This implies that objects are transformed into subjects and subjects are turned into objects, with the result that subjects are rendered passive or determined, while objects are rendered as the active, determining factor. Hypostatization refers to an effect of reification which results from supposing that whatever can be named, or conceived abstractly, must actually exist, an ontological and epistemological fallacy.

The concept is related to but different from Marx's theories of alienation and commodity fetishism. Alienation is the general condition of human estrangement; reification is a specific form of alienation; commodity fetishism is a specific form of reification.

Development and significance of the concept

The concept of reification rose to prominence chiefly through the work of Georg Lukács (1923), in his essay "Reification and the Consciousness of the Proletariat", as part of his book History and Class Consciousness; this is the "locus classicus" for defining the term in its current sense. Here, Lukács treats it as a problem of capitalist society related to the prevalence of the commodity form, through a close reading of Marx's chapter on commodity fetishism in Capital. Reification was not a particularly prominent term or concept in Marx's own works, nor in that of his immediate successors. 

Lukács's account was influential for the philosophers of the Frankfurt School, for example in Horkheimer's and Adorno's Dialectic of Enlightenment, and in the works of Herbert Marcuse, and Axel Honneth. Others who have written about this point include Max Stirner, Guy Debord, Gajo Petrović, Raya Dunayevskaya, Raymond Williams, Timothy Bewes, and Slavoj Žižek.

Petrović (1965) defines reification as:

Reification occurs when specifically human creations are misconceived as "facts of nature, results of cosmic laws, or manifestations of divine will." However, some scholarship on Lukács's (1923) use of the term "reification" in History and Class Consciousness has challenged this interpretation of the concept, according to which reification implies that a pre-existing subject creates an objective social world from which it is then alienated. 

Andrew Feenberg (1981) reinterprets Lukács's central category of "consciousness" as similar to anthropological notions of culture as a set of practices. The reification of consciousness in particular, therefore, is more than just an act of misrecognition; it affects the everyday social practice at a fundamental level beyond the individual subject. 

Other scholarship has suggested that Lukács's use of the term may have been strongly influenced by Edmund Husserl's phenomenology to understand his preoccupation with the reification of consciousness in particular. On this reading, reification entails a stance that separates the subject from the objective world, creating a mistaken relation between subject and object that is reduced to disengaged knowing. Applied to the social world, this leaves individual subjects feeling that society is something they can only know as an alien power, rather than interact with. In this respect, Lukács's use of the term could be seen as prefiguring some of the themes Martin Heidegger (1927) touches on in Being and Time, supporting the suggestion of Lucien Goldman (2009) that Lukács and Heidegger were much closer in their philosophical concerns than typically thought.

Criticism
French philosopher Louis Althusser criticized  what he called the "ideology of reification" that sees "'things' everywhere in human relations." Althusser's critique derives from his theory of the "epistemological break," which finds that Marx underwent significant theoretical and methodological change between his early and his mature work.

Though the concept of reification is used in Das Kapital by Marx, Althusser finds in it an important influence from the similar concept of alienation developed in the early The German Ideology and in the Economic and Philosophical Manuscripts of 1844.

Frankfurt School philosopher Axel Honneth (2008) reformulates this "Western Marxist" concept in terms of intersubjective relations of recognition and power. Instead of being an effect of the structural character of social systems such as capitalism, as Karl Marx and György Lukács argued, Honneth contends that all forms of reification are due to pathologies of intersubjectively based struggles for recognition.

See also
 The Secret of Hegel
 Character mask
 Objectification
 Caste
 Reification (fallacy)

References

Further reading
Arato, Andrew. 1972. "Lukács’s Theory of Reification" Telos.
 Bewes, Timothy. 2002. "Reification, or The Anxiety of Late Capitalism" (illustrated ed.). Verso. . Retrieved via Google Books.
 Burris, Val. 1988. "Reification: A marxist perspective." California Sociologist 10(1). Pp. 22–43.
 Dabrowski, Tomash. 2014. "Reification." Blackwell Encyclopedia of Political Thought. Blackwell. .
Dahms, Harry. 1998. "Beyond the Carousel of Reification: Critical Social Theory after Lukács, Adorno, and Habermas." Current Perspectives in Social Theory 18(1):3–62.
 Duarte, German A. 2011. Reificación Mediática (Sic Editorial)
Dunayevskaya, Raya. "Reification of People and the Fetishism of Commodities." Pp. 167–91 in The Raya Dunayevskaya Collection.
 Floyd, Kevin: "Introduction: On Capital, Sexuality, and the Situations of Knowledge," in The Reification of Desire: Toward a Queer Marxism. Minneapolis, MN.: University of Minnesota Press, 2009.
Gabel, Joseph. 1975. False Consciousness: An Essay On Reification. New York: Harper & Row.
Goldmann, Lucien. 1959 "Réification." Recherches Dialectiques. Paris: Gallimard.
 Honneth, Axel. 2005 March 14–16. "Reification: A Recognition-Theoretical View." The Tanner Lectures on Human Values, delivered at University of California-Berkeley.
Kangrga, Milan. 1968. Was ist Verdinglichung?
 Larsen, Neil. 2011. "Lukács sans Proletariat, or Can History and Class Consciousness be Rehistoricized?." Pp. 81–100 in Georg Lukács: The Fundamental Dissonance of Existence, edited by T. Bewes and T. Hall. London: Continuum.
Löwith, Karl. 1982 [1932]. Max Weber and Karl Marx.
Lukács, Georg. 167 [1923]. History & Class Consciousness. Merlin Press. "Reification and the Consciousness of the Proletariat."
Rubin, I. I. 1972 [1928]. "Essays on Marx’s Theory of Value."
 Schaff, Adam. 1980. Alienation as a Social Phenomenon.
Tadić, Ljubomir. 1969. "Bureaucracy—Reified Organization," edited by M. Marković and G. Petrović. Praxis.
 Vandenberghe, Frederic. 2009. A Philosophical History of German Sociology. London: Routledge.
 Westerman, Richard. 2018. Lukács' Phenomenology of Capitalism: Reification Revalued. New York: Palgrave Macmillan.

Marxist theory
György Lukács

fr:Réification